Karwan-i-Islami is an Islamic Sufi Barelvi organization known for its campaigns to ban liquor, and against restrictions placed by the central government of India on the triple talaq. It has levelled allegations of fraud against the School Education Department of Jammu and Kashmir, claiming money was being allocated to "non-existent" schools.

In 2016, its president, Ghulam Rasool Hami, appealed for people to "come forward and talk to each other" as a means of ending the Kashmir conflict.

See also 
 Tehreek-e-Soutul Auwliya

References

Barelvi organizations
Sunni organizations
Sufi organizations
Islamic organisations based in India